Solvent is the stage name used by electronic producer and remixer Jason Amm. Although his music has been included in the electroclash movement (as his track "My Radio" appeared on Ghostly International's 2002 compilation album Disco Nouveau), many of Solvent's tracks fall under the intelligent dance music or electropop genres. Jason Amm's music is often associated with its strong influence from early 1980s artists such as Soft Cell and Depeche Mode, but the influence is much wider, spanning the last three decades.

With partner Gregory DeRocher (who records his own music using the pseudonym Lowfish), Amm owned and operated the Suction record label until its demise in 2008. This was partly because 12" records were no longer being manufactured in Canada, leading to costly imports from the USA.

Aside from tracks appearing on various-artists compilations, Amm has released several full-length albums using the Solvent moniker.

Discography

Albums
1998 Solvent
1999 Solvently One Listens
2001 Solvent City
2004 Apples + Synthesizers
2005 Elevators + Oscillators
2007 Demonstration Tape (1997-2007)
2010 Subject to Shift
2014 New Ways (Music From The Documentary I Dream of Wires)

External links
 Solvent homepage
 Solvent at Discogs
 Solvent at Morr Music Records

References

1972 births
Canadian electronic musicians
Living people
Musicians from Toronto